Adrian Aeschbacher (10 May 1912 in Langenthal, Switzerland – 9 November 2002 in Zurich) was a Swiss classical pianist.

His father was Carl Aeschbacher. His youth was spent at Trogen where his father was professor of piano at the Conservatoire, and his father was his instructor from the age of four to sixteen. His teachers were Emil Frey (at the Zürich Conservatory) and Volkmar Andreae. He then continued his studies for two years intensively with Artur Schnabel in Berlin and began his performing career in 1934. He became famous as an interpreter of Ludwig van Beethoven, Franz Schubert, Robert Schumann and Johannes Brahms.  Aeschbacher also performed and left recordings of works by Othmar Schoeck, Arthur Honegger, Heinrich Sutermeister and Walter Lang.  He recorded for Decca among other labels.

From 1965 until 1977 he taught at the Hochschule des Saarlandes fur Musik in Saarbrücken.

Aeschbacher's notable students included Anna Renfer and Peter Schmalfuss.

Sources

External links

1912 births
2002 deaths
Academic staff of the Hochschule für Musik Saar
People from Oberaargau District
Swiss classical pianists
People from Langenthal
Pupils of Artur Schnabel
20th-century classical pianists